is a Japanese baseball player. He won a bronze medal at the 1992 Summer Olympics.

References

1967 births
Living people
Baseball players at the 1992 Summer Olympics
Olympic baseball players of Japan
Olympic medalists in baseball
Medalists at the 1992 Summer Olympics
Olympic bronze medalists for Japan
Baseball people from Kōchi Prefecture